Lee Hye-ri (born June 9, 1994), better known mononymously as Hyeri, is a South Korean actress, singer, and television personality. She rose to fame as the youngest member of girl group Girl's Day, and was named as the "Nation's Little Sister" by the South Korean media due to her immense popularity after appearing as a fixed cast member on Real Men (2014).

She later became known for her award-winning performance as the female lead in Reply 1988 (2015), which was the highest-rated drama in Korean cable television history at the time. After back-to-back success in variety and the small screen, Hyeri ranked third in Forbes Korea Power Celebrity list in 2016 and became one of the highest-paid commercial models in South Korea.

Hyeri was a regular cast member on Amazing Saturday (2018–2020). After leaving the show to focus on her acting career, Hyeri starred in the popular iQiyi series My Roommate Is a Gumiho (2021).

Early life and education 
Hyeri was born in Gwangju, Gyeonggi, South Korea. She has a sister, Hye-rim, who is two years younger. Hyeri grew up in poverty, staying with her grandmother in the countryside while her mother was working in a factory.

When she was in middle school, Hyeri was scouted by Dream T Entertainment at a talent show and consequently joined Girl's Day with little prior training. She later attended Seoul School of Performing Arts, and then majored in Film at Konkuk University.

Career

2010–present: Girl's Day

In September 2010, Hyeri was announced as a new member of Girl's Day alongside Yura when Jiin and Jisun left the group, just two months after the group debuted. The revamped group released a single titled "Nothing Lasts Forever", and went on to become one of the most popular and commercially successful musical quartets of its era.

In January 2014, Hyeri fainted on stage during a Girl's Day live performance and had to be carried off-stage by M Countdown staff. She was later diagnosed with swine flu.

After her exclusive contract with Dream T Entertainment ended in 2019, Hyeri joined a newly set-up agency Creative Group ING. Although all four members joined separate agencies, they have stated that the group has not disbanded.

2012–2014: Acting debut and rising popularity
In 2012, Hyeri made her acting debut in the SBS weekend drama Tasty Life, where she played the youngest in a family of four daughters.

After her 4-day long appearance on Real Men in August 2014, a brief clip of her showing aegyo at her instructor went viral in South Korea, reaching one million views in a day, an unprecedented feat at the time. She consequently shot to stardom overnight, and later won Best Female Newcomer award at the MBC Entertainment Awards for her Real Men appearance.

In November 2014, Hyeri was cast as one of the main characters in teen drama Schoolgirl Detectives, which began airing on cable channel JTBC in December. In late 2014, she was also cast in the mystery rom-com drama Hyde, Jekyll, Me, which began airing on SBS in January 2015.

2015–present: Leading roles 
In 2015, Hyeri was cast as the lead of the tvN drama Reply 1988. The drama premiered in November and went on to become a commercial success with audience ratings peaking at 18.8%, making it one of the highest rated dramas in Korean cable television history. Hyeri received critical and audience acclaim for her award-winning portrayal of the female protagonist. In the show, Hyeri's character was the Madagascar picket girl at the 1988 Summer Olympics Opening Ceremony. Due to the series' status as a cultural phenomenon, the actress was chosen by the Madagascar delegation to become its official flag bearer at the 2018 Winter Olympics Opening Ceremony. However, due to her busy schedule, Hyeri declined the offer.

In 2016, Hyeri was cast as the lead in the SBS drama Entertainer along with actor Ji Sung and CNBLUE member Kang Min-hyuk, which began airing on April 20 and for which she won "New Star Award" at 2016 SBS Drama Awards. In 2017, she also starred in the police comedy drama Two Cops alongside Jo Jung-suk and Kim Seon-ho.

In 2017, it was announced that Hyeri would be making her big screen debut as the female lead in Monstrum; filming began in April. Monstrum premiered in September, 2018. In 2018, Hyeri was cast in My Punch-Drunk Boxer, a boxing comedy drama film. The film premiered at 20th Jeonju International Film Festival in September, 2019; its general release followed in October, 2019. In 2019, Hyeri also starred in tvN's office comedy drama Miss Lee.

Besides acting, Hyeri frequently guests on variety shows. She has been described as a "blue chip" in the entertainment industry due to her "frank and easy-going charms, bright energy and flexible chemistry with other cast members". Since 2018, Hyeri had been a regular cast member of DoReMi Market, a weekly television program airing on tvN. In late 2020, she left the show to focus on her acting career.

In 2021, Hyeri starred in tvN's fantasy-romance drama My Roommate Is a Gumiho alongside Jang Ki-yong, produced by iQIYI. The series was a commercial success, amassing more than 100 million views on the online video platform and becoming its most-watched original drama series of the year. Later that year, Hyeri starred in KBS2's historical drama Moonshine alongside Yoo Seung-ho. 

In 2022, Hyeri starred in the television series May I Help You.

Philanthropy 
Hyeri was appointed as the ambassador for 'Free Semester Program' by the Ministry of Education in September 2016. In February 2017, Hyeri was appointed as one of the ambassadors for the Count Every Child birth registration campaign as part of her NGO partnership with Plan Korea. In 2018, Hyeri participated in a Plan Korea fundraiser for children born without birth registration and wrote a letter to fans asking for potential donors.

At 25 years old, Hyeri became the youngest member of UNICEF's Honors Club, having donated more than ₩100 million "to run educational programs for underprivileged children and AIDS-prevention campaigns in underdeveloped nations in Asia". A membership ceremony took place on July 26, 2019.

Throughout her career, Hyeri has donated to a wide variety of causes, ranging from public health to disaster management. On the Lunar New Year of 2016, Hyeri donated ₩50 million to Community Chest of Korea towards improving elderly welfare. Later that year, she donated ₩50 million to Korea Disaster Relief Organisation for the victims of the Seomun Market fire. In February 2020, Hyeri donated ₩100 million to Save the Children to help those affected by COVID-19.

In 2022, Hyeri donated ₩50 million to the Hope Bridge Disaster Relief Association to help the victims of the massive wildfire that started in Uljin, Gyeongbuk and has spread to Samcheok, Gangwon. That same year, Hyeri donated ₩50 million to the Save the Children emergency relief in order to help Ukrainian victims during the Russian invasion, stating that she "wants to give a little help to the suffering children who are powerless in times of war" and that she hopes "a world without war and fear will come one day".

In 2023, Hyeri donated 50 million won to help 2023 Turkey–Syria earthquake, by donating money through UNICEF's emergency relief program to help children affected by earthquakes in Turkey and Syria.

In the media

Endorsements 
The success of Reply 1988 combined with Hyeri's status as an icon of aegyo led to her becoming one of the most in-demand advertising models in South Korea. By the start of 2016, she had shot over 30 advertisements for brands such as Puma, Lotte Confectionery's Ghana, Bohae, Amore Pacific's Happy Bath, and was consequently given the title of "₩10 billion girl (ko: 100억 소녀)" by the South Korean media.

Following her appointment as the model for Albamon (ko: 알바몬), a part-time job recruiting site, Hyeri was awarded with the plaque of appreciation by the Ministry of Employment and Labour for "promoting minimum wage awareness and compliance" in March 2015. In January 2017, Albamon received "Consumer Choice Best Brand Award" for "its efforts to improve the rights of the public by providing high quality part-time job announcements" after an ad featuring Hyeri and Im Chang-jung reached over 10 million views in just a month after its release.

The sales of products such as 7-Eleven lunch boxes and Nongshim ramen increased by 78% and 50% respectively after Hyeri's endorsement. Similarly, the page views of Dabang (ko: 다방), a real estate mobile app that Hyeri has endorsed since 2015, grew from 5 million to 15 million, and weekly active users increased from 600,000 to 1.5 million after a new ad featuring Hyeri as Harley Quinn was released in 2017. In July 2017, she received the Female Commercial Film Star Award at MTN Broadcast Advertising Awards Festival.

Social media 
In July 2019, Hyeri unveiled her personal YouTube channel, where she began posting vlogs, mukbangs, and behind the scenes footage from filming sets. A month later, she received The Silver Creator Award for surpassing 100,000 subscribers. In 2020, she was awarded the "Celebrity YouTuber of the Year" prize at the Brand of the Year Awards.

In March 2020, Hyeri criticised Nth room-related cybersex trafficking on her Instagram account and urged her followers to sign a petition to reveal the identities of the perpetrators, stating that she hopes that "they face harsher punishment for what they did".

Personal life

Hyeri is in a relationship with actor and former co-star Ryu Jun-yeol. The two met on the set of Reply 1988, where they played each other's love interest, and began dating in late 2016.

In March 2016, Hyeri was hospitalised after being diagnosed with meningitis due to busy schedules and lack of rest.

Discography

Filmography

Film

Television series

Television show

Hosting

Awards and nominations

Listicles

Notes

References

External links

 
 

1994 births
Living people
People from Gwangju
Girl's Day members
K-pop singers
South Korean female idols
South Korean child singers
South Korean women pop singers
South Korean dance musicians
South Korean television personalities
South Korean television actresses
South Korean film actresses
21st-century South Korean singers
21st-century South Korean actresses
School of Performing Arts Seoul alumni
Konkuk University alumni
21st-century South Korean women singers